Transport 6 is a mix album released by Trendroid in 2002. It was released on Kinetic Records.

Track listing

Disc 1
Earth Deuley Presents Kito Kala - "Black House" 
Sean Thomas - "Free Thing/Lexicon Avenue - From Dusk Till Dawn (A Cappella)"
Ralphi Rosario & Martin Fry - "First Reunion" 
Sultan & Tone Depth - "Sagres" 
Monkeyboy - "Fleabitten" 
Cuba Computers - "Haunting Me (Iberican Dubby Remix)"/Lexicon Avenue - "From Dusk Till Dawn (Sander Kleinenberg's Audio Paranoid Dubapella)" 
Datar - "U (Original Dub Version)"
Akodama - "Slightly Forward (Trendroid Mix) 
Stereonova - "Open Your Eyes" 
Drive Red 5 - "The Pleasurist" 
Riot Society - "Understand Me" 
Pocket - "Carnivore"

Disc 2
Prince Quick Mix Meets Stephane K - "Insane Poem (Stephane K Mix)"
Sapphirecut - "Action Reaction"
Paul Hamill - "Be You (Trent Cantrelle Mix)"
D. Ramirez - "Bounce Your DJ"/Lexicon Avenue - "From Dusk Till Dawn (Sander Kleinenberg's Audio Paranoid Dubapella)"   
Trendroid - "Trendication" 
Carl Cox & Christian Smith - "Dirty Bass" 
Filterheadz - "The Rhythm" 
Forbidden Planet - "Ecoute La Musique" 
Chris Fraser - "Flash Point" 
Pako & Frederik - "Western Approaches (Evolution Remix)" 
Jimmy van M & Young American Primitive - "Forget Time (Prawler Remix)" 
Valentino - "Flying" 
MV - "Slinger"

External links

2002 compilation albums
Techno compilation albums
DJ mix albums
Kinetic Records compilation albums